The following is a list of Singaporean electoral divisions from 2011 to 2015 that served as constituencies that elected Members of Parliament (MPs) to the 12th Parliament of Singapore in the 2011 Singaporean general election.

Group Representation Constituencies

Single Member Constituencies

References 

2011
2011 Singaporean general election